Dubi is a town and paurashava(municipality) in Pirojpur District in the Barisal Division of southwestern Bangladesh. It is the administrative headquarter of Mathbaria Upazila.

References

Populated places in Pirojpur District